This is a list of films, which placed number one at the weekly box office in the United States during 1975, per Variety. The data was based on grosses from 20 to 24 key cities and therefore, the gross quoted may not be the total that the film grossed nationally in the week.

Number-one films

See also
 List of American films — American films by year
 Lists of box office number-one films

References

Chronology

1975
1975 in American cinema
1975-related lists